Ignacio Drago (born 27 October 1985) is a Peruvian footballer who plays as a goalkeeper.

Club career
Ignacio Drago started career out with Unión Huaral in 2005. He made a couple of appearances in the 2006 season.

Then in 2007 Drago joined Cienciano, There he had to compete with Jesús Cisneros and Juan Flores for a starting spot.

He then had spells with Deportivo Aviación in 2008 and later with Total Chalaco in 2009.

In January 2009 he joined Sport Boys, which were in the Segunda División at the time. He made 22 appearances his side's league winning season. With Boys promoted, he stayed on the following season and played 20 times in the Descentralizado. 

Then in January 2011 Drago joined ambitious club Juan Aurich.

Honours

Club 
Sport Boys
 Segunda División Peruana: 2009

Juan Aurich
 Torneo Descentralizado: 2011

References

1985 births
Living people
Footballers from Lima
Peruvian footballers
Peruvian Primera División players
Unión Huaral footballers
Cienciano footballers
Sport Boys footballers
Juan Aurich footballers
Association football goalkeepers